The 2019 MFF  Charity Cup (also known as the 2019 MPT Charity Cup for sponsorship reasons) is the 8th Charity Cup, an annual football match played between the winners of the previous National League and Domestic Cup competitions. It was held at Aung San Stadium on 6 January 2018. The match was played between Yangon United, champions of the 2018 Myanmar National League and Shan United, runner-up of the 2018 Myanmar National League.

This was Yangon United's 5th Cup appearance and Shan United's 3rd time Cup appearance, they won Charity Cup for the first time as Kanbawza FC in 2016.

Match

Team selection

Details

Statistics

References

MFF Charity Cup
2019 in Burmese football